Trento, officially the Municipality of Trento,  is a 1st class municipality in the province of Agusan del Sur, Philippines. According to the 2020 census, it has a population of 54,492 people.

Trento was formerly a barrio of Bunawan called Bahayan (referring to a lead sinker at the base of a fishing net). On June 15, 1968, it became a separate municipality through Republic Act No.  5283. The town's name was derived from the Council of Trent.

Geography

According to the Philippine Statistics Authority, the municipality has a land area of  constituting  of the  total area of Agusan del Sur.

Climate

Trento is classified as Type II climate which has no dry season but with pronounced maximum rain period occurring from December to January.

Barangays
Trento is politically subdivided into 16 barangays.

Demographics

In the 2020 census, Trento had a population of 54,492.

Economy

Its economy is dependent heavily on subsistence agriculture, wood products, and some mining.

Education
 Trento National High School
 Father Saturnino Urios College Of Trento, Inc.

References

External links
 [ Philippine Standard Geographic Code]

Municipalities of Agusan del Sur